Lee Min-hyeong, better known as Gumayusi, is a South Korean professional League of Legends player for T1. He made his LCK debut in the Korea Regional Finals 2020.

He was a trainee of T1 before being promoted to the team.

Early life 

He was born in South Korea on February 6, 2002. He is the younger brother of Lee "INnoVation" Shin-hyung, a South Korean former professional StarCraft II player. Lee is also the distant nephew of  Lee "Faker" Sang-hyeok, his fellow T1 teammate and part-owner. Lee is a Christian.

His role model is Uzi.

Career

Season 8 
On December 18, 2018, Lee played in KeSPA Cup 2018 under the amateur team, KeG Seoul. His team defeated pro LCK team, Hanwha Life Esports with a match score of 2–1.

In December, it was announced that Lee joined SK Telecom T1 under the name "Catan".

Season 9 
During his time as trainee, he and four other trainees from T1, Canna, Ellim, Mask, and Kuri, competed in the 2019 LoL Amateur Tournament. The team was called 'T1 rookies', and they won the tournament.

On November 26, 2019, T1 announced that Lee was called up to the main roster.

Season 10 
Lee made his debut in the LCK on Regional Finals. His debut match was against Afreeca Freecs, which he won with a match score of 3–1.

On November 24, 2020, Lee re-signed with T1.

Season 11 
On January 13, 2021, Lee played his first game of the season in LCK Spring 2021. He served as the main player of the roster for the first time in his career. The game was against Hanwha Life Esports.

Lee got his first pentakill in his career in the match against DWG KIA. He achieved the milestone with Aphelios.

Lee was included in the roster for the 2021 League of Legends World Championship, in which he and his teammates ended the journey in the semifinals.

On December 3, 2021, Lee re-signed with T1.

Season 12 

Lee broke the record of the player with the most kills in a season, setting the record to 219 kills. He was also a member of the team that went undefeated in the regular season with a 18-0 record, becoming the first team to achieve this record in the LCK.

Lee won his first LCK title with his teammates in the 2022 LCK Spring finals.

Season 13

Accomplishments

Individual awards 

 2022 LCK Spring Split All-Pro 1st Team
 2022 LCK AWARDS Woori Won Banking Gold King

References

External links 

 

Living people
South Korean esports players
2002 births
T1 (esports) players
League of Legends AD Carry players
Twitch (service) streamers